Lithuania participated in the Eurovision Song Contest 2013 with the song "Something" written and performed by Andrius Pojavis. The Lithuanian broadcaster Lithuanian National Radio and Television (LRT) organised the national final "Eurovizijos" dainų konkurso nacionalinė atranka (Eurovision Song Contest national selection) in order to select the Lithuanian entry for the 2013 contest in Malmö, Sweden. The national final took place over ten weeks and involved 39 competing entries. In the final, seven entries remained and the winner was selected over two rounds of voting. In the first round, the combination of votes from a jury panel and a public vote selected the top three to qualify to the superfinal. In the superfinal, a jury vote entirely selected "Something" performed by Andrius Pojavis as the winner.

Lithuania was drawn to compete in the first semi-final of the Eurovision Song Contest which took place on 14 May 2013. Performing during the show in position 10, "Something" was announced among the top 10 entries of the first semi-final and therefore qualified to compete in the final on 18 May. It was later revealed that Lithuania placed ninth out of the 16 participating countries in the semi-final with 53 points. In the final, Lithuania performed in position 2 and placed twenty-second out of the 26 participating countries with 17 points.

Background 

Prior to the 2013 contest, Lithuania had participated in the Eurovision Song Contest thirteen times since its first entry in 1994. The nation’s best placing in the contest was sixth, which it achieved in 2006 with the song "We Are the Winners" performed by LT United. Following the introduction of semi-finals in 2004, Lithuania, to this point, has managed to qualify to the final four times. In the 2012 contest, "Love Is Blind" performed by Donny Montell qualified to the final where the song scored 70 points and placed 14th.

For the 2013 contest, the Lithuanian national broadcaster, Lithuanian National Radio and Television (LRT), broadcast the event within Lithuania and organised the selection process for the nation's entry. Other than the internal selection of their debut entry in 1994, Lithuania has selected their entry consistently through a national final procedure. LRT confirmed their intentions to participate at the 2013 Eurovision Song Contest on 12 September 2012 and announced the organization of "Eurovizijos" dainų konkurso nacionalinė atranka, which would be the national final to select Lithuania's entry for Malmö.

Before Eurovision

"Eurovizijos" dainų konkurso nacionalinė atranka 
"Eurovizijos" dainų konkurso nacionalinė atranka (Eurovision Song Contest national selection) was the national final format developed by LRT in order to select Lithuania's entry for the Eurovision Song Contest 2013. The competition involved an eight-week-long process that commenced on 3 November 2012 and concluded with a winning song and artist on 20 December 2012. The ten shows took place at the LRT studios in Vilnius and were hosted by Andrius Rožickas. The shows were broadcast on LRT televizija, LRT Lituanica and LRT Radijas as well as online via the broadcaster's website lrt.lt. The final was also streamed online at the official Eurovision Song Contest website eurovision.tv.

Format 
The 2013 competition involved 39 entries and consisted of ten shows. The first two shows were the introductory shows where the competing entries were announced. The third to seventh shows were the heats consisting of seven or eight entries each. The top three entries proceeded in the competition from each heat, while LRT also selected three wildcard acts out of the remaining non-qualifying acts from the heats. The eighth and ninth shows were the competition's semi-finals where nine entries participated in each show and the top four proceeded to the final. In the final, the winner was selected from the remaining eight entries over two rounds of voting. The first round results selected the top three entries, while the second round determined the winner.

The results of each of the five shows were determined by the votes from a jury panel and public televoting. The qualifiers during the semi-finals and the first round of the final were determined by the 50/50 combination of votes from the jury and public. The ranking developed by both streams of voting was converted to points from 1-8, 10 and 12 and assigned based on the number of competing songs in the respective show. The public could vote through telephone and SMS voting. Ties were decided in favour of the entry that received the most points from the jury. In the second round of the final, only the jury voted. The jury panel in the heats and semi-finals consisted of four members, while the jury panel in the final consisted of seven-members.

Competing entries 
LRT opened a submission period on 12 September 2012 for artists and songwriters to submit their entries with the deadline on 1 October 2012. The 39 entries selected for the competition were announced during the introductory shows on 20 and 27 October 2012. Among the artists was previous Lithuanian Eurovision contestant Linas Adomaitis, who represented Lithuania in 2004.

Heats
The five heats of the competition aired on 3 November, 10 November,17 November, 24 November and 1 December 2012 and featured the 39 competing entries. The members of the jury consisted of Darius Užkuraitis (LRT Opus director; all heats), Zita Kelmickaitė (musicologist; all heats), Ramūnas Zilnys (music reviewer; first to third and fifth heats), Deivydas Zvonkus (lead singer of the group B'Avarija; first, fourth and fifth heat), Donatas Montvydas (singer-songwriter; second and third heat), Sasha Song (singer-songwriter; second and third heat) and Vytautas Miškinis (professor; fourth heat). The top three entries advanced to the semi-finals from each heat, while the bottom entries were eliminated. Following the first heat, "I'll Carry You" performed by Julija Jegorova was disqualified as the song had been publicly performed by German singer Onita Boone before 1 September 2012. On 6 December 2012, LRT announced the three entries that had received a wildcard to also proceed to the semi-finals.

Semi-finals
The two semi-finals of the competition aired on 8 and 15 December 2012 and featured nine entries each. The members of the jury for both semi-finals consisted of Darius Užkuraitis (LRT Opus director), Zita Kelmickaitė (musicologist), Ramūnas Zilnys (music reviewer) and Vaidas Stackevičius (producer). The top four entries advanced to the final from each semi-final, while the bottom five were eliminated. Monika Linkytė, who advanced from the second semi-final, later withdrew from the competition due to a laryngitis infection.

Final
The final of the competition took place on 20 December 2012 and featured the remaining seven entries that qualified from the semi-finals. The final was the only show in the competition to be broadcast live; all other preceding shows were pre-recorded earlier in the week before their airdates. The members of the jury consisted of Darius Užkuraitis (LRT Opus director), Zita Kelmickaitė (musicologist), Saulius Urbonavičius (musician, singer-songwriter), Andrius Mamontovas (musician), Ramūnas Zilnys (music reviewer), Povilas Meškėla (lead singer of the group Rojaus tūzai) and Vaidas Stackevičius (producer). The winner was selected over two rounds of voting. In the first round, the three entries that gained the most points from the jury vote and the public vote advanced to the superfinal, while the bottom eleven were eliminated. In the superfinal, "Something" performed by Andrius Pojavis was selected as the winner after gaining the most points from the jurors. In addition to the performances of the competing entries, Pop Ladies and Šarka performed as the interval acts.

Preparation 
On 10 February, LRT broadcast the support concert Būkime kartu where Lithuanian viewers could call to donate funds to support the Lithuanian Eurovision participation. The concert featured guests Saulės Broliai, Monika Linkytė, Gerai Gerai and Miss Sheep, Donny Montell, Sasha Song, Pikaso, 4Fun and Veronika Povilionienė, and raised over 30,000 LTL from the public donations.

Promotion 
Andrius Pojavis specifically promoted "Something" as the Lithuanian Eurovision entry on 13 April 2013 by performing during the Eurovision in Concert event which was held at the Melkweg venue in Amsterdam, Netherlands and hosted by Marlayne and Linda Wagenmakers. In addition to his international appearance, on 31 March, Pojavis performed during the TV3 show Chorų karai.

At Eurovision
According to Eurovision rules, all nations with the exceptions of the host country and the "Big Five" (France, Germany, Italy, Spain and the United Kingdom) are required to qualify from one of two semi-finals in order to compete for the final; the top ten countries from each semi-final progress to the final. The European Broadcasting Union (EBU) split up the competing countries into six different pots based on voting patterns from previous contests, with countries with favourable voting histories put into the same pot. On 17 January 2013, an allocation draw was held which placed each country into one of the two semi-finals, as well as which half of the show they would perform in. Lithuania was placed into the first semi-final, to be held on 14 May 2013, and was scheduled to perform in the second half of the show.

Once all the competing songs for the 2013 contest had been released, the running order for the semi-finals was decided by the shows' producers rather than through another draw, so that similar songs were not placed next to each other. Lithuania was set to perform in position 10, following the entry from Montenegro and before the entry from Belarus.

The two semi-finals and final were broadcast in Lithuania on LRT televizija and LRT Radijas with commentary by Darius Užkuraitis. The Lithuanian spokesperson, who announced the Lithuanian votes during the final, was Ignas Krupavičius.

Semi-final 

Andrius Pojavis took part in technical rehearsals on 7 and 10 May, followed by dress rehearsals on 13 and 14 May. This included the jury show on 13 May where the professional juries of each country watched and voted on the competing entries.

The Lithuanian performance featured Andrius Pojavis performing on stage with purple stage colours and lighting. The performance focused on Pojavis gazing into the camera to convey the song's love message. Andrius Pojavis was joined by four backing vocalists: Anatolijus Oleinikas, Jurijus Veklenko, Martynas Puchovičius and Monica Cikanovačiktė. Veklenko would go on to represent Lithuania in the Eurovision Song Contest 2019.

At the end of the show, Lithuania was announced as having finished in the top 10 and subsequently qualifying for the grand final. It was later revealed that Lithuania placed ninth in the semi-final, receiving a total of 53 points.

Final 
Shortly after the first semi-final, a winners' press conference was held for the ten qualifying countries. As part of this press conference, the qualifying artists took part in a draw to determine which half of the grand final they would subsequently participate in. This draw was done in the order the countries appeared in the semi-final running order. Lithuania was drawn to compete in the first half. Following this draw, the shows' producers decided upon the running order of the final, as they had done for the semi-finals. Lithuania was subsequently placed to perform in position 2, following the entry from France and before the entry from Moldova.

Andrius Pojavis once again took part in dress rehearsals on 17 and 18 May before the final, including the jury final where the professional juries cast their final votes before the live show. Andrius Pojavis performed a repeat of his semi-final performance during the final on 18 May. At the conclusion of the voting, Lithuania finished in twenty-second place with 17 points.

Voting 
Voting during the three shows consisted of 50 percent public televoting and 50 percent from a jury deliberation. The jury consisted of five music industry professionals who were citizens of the country they represent. This jury was asked to judge each contestant based on: vocal capacity; the stage performance; the song's composition and originality; and the overall impression by the act. In addition, no member of a national jury could be related in any way to any of the competing acts in such a way that they cannot vote impartially and independently.

Following the release of the full split voting by the EBU after the conclusion of the competition, it was revealed that Lithuania had placed twenty-first with the public televote and twenty-fifth with the jury vote in the final. In the public vote, Lithuania received an average rank of 16,73, while with the jury vote, Lithuania received an average rank of 17.95. In the first semi-final, Lithuania placed fifth with the public televote with an average rank of 7.44 and eleventh with the jury vote with an average rank of 9.37.

Below is a breakdown of points awarded to Lithuania and awarded by Lithuania in the first semi-final and grand final of the contest. The nation awarded its 12 points to Ukraine in the semi-final and to Azerbaijan in the final of the contest.

Points awarded to Lithuania

Points awarded by Lithuania

References

2013
Countries in the Eurovision Song Contest 2013
Eurovision